Mark Lambert Bristol (April 17, 1868 – May 13, 1939) was a rear admiral in the United States Navy.

Biography
He was born on April 17, 1868, in Glassboro, New Jersey. Bristol graduated from the United States Naval Academy in 1887. During the Spanish–American War, he served aboard the battleship USS Texas and participated in the Battle of Santiago de Cuba. From 1901 to 1903, he served as aide to the Commander-in-Chief North Atlantic Fleet. He commanded the battleship USS Oklahoma during World War I.

He served as the US High Commissioner in Turkey (1919–1927). His correspondence and other documents that he gathered are often cited during discussions on numerous events of that era, including Turkish-Armenian relations in which he played a significant role in his opposition to Armenian aspirations and American involvement in assuming a mandate in Armenia,

Bristol was an antisemite who also hated the Greeks and the Armenians. His documents include writings such as the following in reference to a Greek newspaper reporter: "Mrs. Danos was typical of the races in this part of the country. She is obsequious and cringing and says she wants the truth but she probably couldn't write the truth if she knew it."  The collection includes several examples of such opinions. It is particularly rich in its coverage of Bristol's duties as commander of the US Naval Detachment in Turkish Waters and concurrent service as US High Commissioner to Turkey after World War I. In 1919 he called the Greeks "about the worst race in the Near East", and he also stated that "Armenians are a race like the Jews; they have little or no national spirit and have poor moral character".

Topics from the period include racial and religious conflicts in the Near East; the Great Fire of Smyrna; Allied activities in pursuit of special interests, mandates, and empire; the decline of the Ottoman Empire; and the rise of Mustafa Kemal and the Nationalist Movement, which led to the founding of modern Turkey.

In 1927, Bristol assumed command of the Asiatic Fleet and helped found the American Hospital in Nişantaşı, İstanbul, in 1920 and the annexed nursing school, which is still named Admiral Bristol Nursing School after him.

Bristol served as chairman of the General Board of the United States Navy from 1930 to 1932 and died on May 13, 1939.

After his death, in 1945 he was honored by the renaming of the American Hospital in Turkey to the Admiral Bristol American Hospital.

Namesakes
Two ships have been named USS Bristol in his honor.

References

Bibliography
 

 Smyrna 1922: The Destruction of a City by Marjorie Housepian Dobkin (1971)

 Paradise Lost: Smyrna 1922 by Giles Milton, 2008, Sceptre, 

 The Thirty-Year Genocide: Turkey’s Destruction of Its Christian Minorities, 1894–1924 by Benny Morris and Dror Ze'evi

 The Blight of Asia: On the Systematic Extermination of Christian Populations in Asia by George Horton

External links

 hazegray.org: USS Bristol
 Admiral Mark Bristol

1868 births
1939 deaths
United States Navy personnel of World War I
People from Glassboro, New Jersey
American military personnel of the Spanish–American War
United States Naval Academy alumni
United States Navy rear admirals
Military personnel from New Jersey
Military personnel of the Greco-Turkish War (1919–1922)
Recipients of the Navy Distinguished Service Medal